The vimentin 3′ UTR protein-binding region is an RNA element that contains a Y shaped structure which has been shown to have protein binding activity. The same region has been implicated in the control of mRNA localisation to the perinuclear region of the cytoplasm, possibly at sites of intermediate filament assembly. The identity of the proteins involved and the localisation mechanism are not known.

References

External links 
 
 Transterm page for Vimentin Localisation Element

Cis-regulatory RNA elements